Mattawa may refer to:

Mattawa, Ontario, Canada
Mattawa River, Ontario, Canada
Mattawa Bay, on the Gouin Reservoir, in Quebec, Canada
Mattawa, Washington, U.S.

See also
 Mattawan (disambiguation)